Ballota is one of nine parishes (administrative divisions) in the Cudillero municipality, within the province and autonomous community of Asturias, in northern Spain. 

The population is 305 ( INE 2008).

Villages
 Reseḷḷinas
 Santa Marina
 Vaḷḷouta

References

Parishes in Cudillero